Han Grijzenhout ( – 18 December 2020) was a Dutch football manager.

He died on 18 December 2020, aged 87.

References

External links
 Club Brugge Biography  

1932 births
2020 deaths
Dutch footballers
Dutch football managers
Dutch expatriate football managers
Cercle Brugge K.S.V. managers
K.S.C. Lokeren Oost-Vlaanderen managers
Club Brugge KV head coaches
K.A.A. Gent managers
K.V. Kortrijk managers
Footballers from Amsterdam
Expatriate football managers in Belgium
Association football defenders
K.V. Oostende managers
S.C. Eendracht Aalst managers
Dutch expatriate sportspeople in Belgium
K. Waterschei S.V. Thor Genk managers